The Best Job in the World is a 1996 French drama film directed by Gérard Lauzier. It was entered into the 20th Moscow International Film Festival.

Cast
 Gérard Depardieu as Laurent Monier
 Michèle Laroque as Hélène Monier
 Ticky Holgado as Baudouin
 Souad Amidou as Radia Ben Saïd
 Guy Marchand as Gauthier
 Philippe Khorsand as Le gardien de l'immeuble
 Daniel Prévost as Albert Constantini, le voisin
 Roschdy Zem as Ahmed Raouch
 Mouss Diouf as Momo
 Joseph Malerba as Taxi driver

References

External links
 

1996 films
1996 drama films
1990s French-language films
French drama films
Films directed by Gérard Lauzier
1990s French films